General Bowen may refer to:

Frank S. Bowen (1905–1976), U.S. Army major general
James Bowen (railroad executive) (1808–1886), Union Army brigadier general
John S. Bowen (1830–1863), Confederate States Army major general
Thomas M. Bowen (1835–1906), Union Army brevet brigadier general
William Bowen (British Army officer) (1898–1961), British Army major general

See also
Liu Bowen (family name "Liu", 1311–1375), Ming dynasty general
Attorney General Bowen (disambiguation)